Nance-Horan syndrome protein is a protein that in humans is encoded by the NHS gene.

This gene encodes a protein containing four conserved nuclear localization signals. The encoded protein may function during the development of the eyes, teeth, and brain. Mutations in this gene have been shown to cause Nance-Horan syndrome. An alternative splice variant has been described, but its full-length nature has not been determined.

References

Further reading